Marion Burnside Randall (October 8, 1935 – October 26, 1984), who acted under the name Sue Randall, was an American television actress whose entire seventeen-year career (1950 to 1967) was spent in episodes of TV series, and one film (1957). Her best known role was the kindly Miss Alice Landers, Theodore "Beaver" Cleaver's elementary school teacher in the CBS and ABC sitcom Leave It to Beaver.

Early life and education
Born in Philadelphia, Sue Randall was the younger of two children of Marion Burnside (née Heist) and Roland Rodrock Randall, a prominent real-estate consultant. She began acting on stage at the age of 10 in a production of the Alden Park Players. In 1953 she completed her early education at the Lankenau School for Girls in the Germantown District of Philadelphia and then moved to New York, where she attended the American Academy of Dramatic Arts, graduating with honors.

Film and television career

Randall's credited TV debut came in the 1955 episode "Golden Victory" of the series Star Tonight. She was one of the actresses who had the role of Diane Emerson in the television version of Valiant Lady (1953-1957). In 1954, she also portrayed Diane Emerson on the CBS drama Woman with a Past.

Randall appeared in other television productions before portraying Ruthie Saylor, a reference-desk worker, in the 1957 film Desk Set starring Spencer Tracy and Katharine Hepburn. Randall's recurring role as a teacher on Leave It to Beaver spanned the years 1958 to 1962, when the actress was in her twenties. She appeared in 28 episodes of the popular sitcom after replacing Diane Brewster, who played Miss Canfield during the first season and in the 1980s television movies based on the series. Randall's first appearance as Miss Landers was in the Leave It to Beaver episode "Ward's Problem", which originally aired on October 16, 1958.

Primarily, Randall's roles on television were as a featured actor or supporting character, often in Westerns.  For example, she was cast as Kathy O'Hara, an aspiring concert pianist, in the episode "The Mysterious Stranger" (February 17, 1959) on the ABC/Warner Brothers series Sugarfoot. She was cast in "Judgment Day" (October 11, 1959) on the ABC series The Rebel as Elaine, the daughter of a man sentenced to hang.

In the late 1950s, producers cast Randall as a co-star with actress Theodora Davitt in a proposed weekly sitcom titled Up on Cloud Nine.  A pilot for this comedy was completed, but no potential sponsors opted to buy or underwrite the series about "the daffy misadventures" of two airline stewardesses. In the pilot episode's storyline, described by one later reviewer as "painfully unfunny", Randall and Davitt's characters insult passengers and frighten them while in flight by mistakenly preparing their plane for a crash landing.

Randall appeared in other series, including CBS's The Twilight Zone, Have Gun – Will Travel, Gunsmoke (as “Laura” in S7E9’s “Millie”, and as "Effie Strayhorn" in S6E14's "The Cook"), Bat Masterson, The Aquanauts, Pete and Gladys, Ichabod and Me, and Hennesey, NBC's Bonanza and The Man and the Challenge, and ABC's The Real McCoys, The Dakotas, 77 Sunset Strip, The Fugitive, and The Rifleman.  In addition, she made three guest appearances on Sea Hunt in 1961.  That same year she also guest starred as Ellen in the episode "The Secret Life of James Thurber", based on the works of the American humorist James Thurber, in the CBS anthology series The DuPont Show with June Allyson. She made two guest appearances on Perry Mason, both times as the defendant: Betty Wilkins in the 1960 episode, "The Case of the Ill-Fated Faker," and Arnell Stiller, alias Amy Scott, in the 1964 episode, "The Case of the Garrulous Go-Between".

Randall appeared also in five episodes of the syndicated western anthology Death Valley Days. Her last performance in that series was in 1966, when she was cast as Carrie Huntington in the episode "The Courtship of Carrie Huntington".

Personal life
Randall was married to Peter Blake Powell, with whom she had two children. She later married James J. McSparron, and was still married at the time of her death.

Later years and death
Randall retired from acting in 1967 after performing in the episode "Heaven Help Us" on the televised anthology series Vacation Playhouse. Two years later, she left California and returned to Philadelphia, where she soon began working in administrative roles with various charitable organizations. She participated in telethons and other local events to raise money to support programs and research battling arthritis, multiple sclerosis, blindness, and poor childhood education.

Randall was a smoker most of her adult life. She succumbed to lung and larynx cancer at Pennsylvania Hospital in Philadelphia on October 26, 1984. She was 49.

Filmography

References

External links

 

1935 births
1984 deaths
American television actresses
American film actresses
Actresses from Philadelphia
American Academy of Dramatic Arts alumni
Deaths from lung cancer in Pennsylvania
20th-century American actresses